Duke Ling of Wey (ruled  534 — 492 BC) was the 28th ruler of the ancient Chinese state of Wey, the son of Duke Xiang of Wey. He was the subject of Chapter 15 of the Analects of Confucius. His given name was Yuan.

Family
Duke Ling was born to Duke Xiang and the concubine . Duke Ling’s wife was Lady Nanzi, whilst his son was Prince Kuaikui. Duke Ling was succeeded by his grandson Duke Chu, son of Kuaikui.

Life
When Duke Xiang of Wey died, he did not specify an heir apparent. Lord Kong Zhengchi consulted the oracles of I Ching and Shu Feng of Kang's mandate in order to choose an heir. The oracles and the spirit of Shu Feng favoured prince Yuan, the second son of Duke Xiang. According to the religious convention, Kong Zhengchi therefore decided to enthrone prince Yuan as the next Duke of Wey. In 535 BCE, Yuan succeeded the title of duke (Gong). 

In 522 BCE Duke Ling was forced to flee to the city of Siniao due to a sudden rebellion of his retainers Qi Bao, Beigong Xi, and Chu Shipu. Qi Bao's rebellion was caused by Duke Ling's elder brother Zhi Gongmeng, who abused his power as a prince. Zhi Gongmeng deprived Qi Bao of his land and gave him orders arrogantly, thus humiliating Qi Bao. While in Siniao, Duke Ling received an envoy from the state of Qi. Upon receiving the envoy, Duke Ling admitted that he was not an apt ruler. Later, Qi Bao was assassinated by Beigong Xi's own retainer, who did not know that his own lord was allied with Qi Bao. After the death of Qi Bao, Duke Ling returned to Diqiu, the capital city of Wey. He did not punish Beigong Xi for plotting against him. 

Duke Ling's elder son, Prince Kuaikui, attempted to murder his mother, Lady Nanzi. The plan was not successful, and Kuaikui fled to Jin; Kuaikui's son Zhe remained in Wey.

In 493 BCE Duke Ling died after 42 years on the throne. His widow Lady Nanzi wanted to enthrone Prince Ying, but Ying refused the proposition, instead recommending his brother Kuaikui's son Zhe as the heir apparent. Consequently, Zhe succeeded Duke Ling and was known as Duke Chu of Wey.

Duke Ling and Mizi Xia
Duke Ling was one of the most famous representatives of the homosexual tradition in China, as portrayed in the philosophic work Han Feizi by Han Fei. In the chapter Shuonan, Duke Ling favours a courtier named Mizi Xia, who he allows to use the ducal carriage without permission, and who he admires for handing over the remainder of an especially delicious peach. Han Fei records that once Mizi Xia's looks faded, however, the Duke turned against his former lover, accusing him of stealing the carriage and of degrading the Duke by giving him a half-eaten peach. This story was so widespread amongst the literati of China that the phrase "the bitten peach" (餘桃) became a byword for homosexuality.

In media
Duke Ling was played by Bi Yanjun in the biographical fantasy adventure drama film Confucius.

References

Year of birth unknown
Zhou dynasty nobility
492 BC deaths
Monarchs of Wey (state)
LGBT royalty
Chinese LGBT people
Ancient LGBT people
LGBT heads of state